Lullaby (published as The Perfect Nanny in the United States) is a 2016 novel by French author Leïla Slimani.

Plot
The book deals with the murder of two children by their nanny. It was inspired by the real-life 2012 murder of children by their nanny in New York.

Background
Lullaby is Slimani's second novel and the first to be translated into English. By January 2018 it had been translated into 18 languages, with intentions for a further 17. Originally titled Chanson douce, it was translated as Lullaby for the UK and The Perfect Nanny in the US.

It sold 600,000 copies in France in its first year of publication.

Publication history
  240 pages.
  224 pages.
  240 pages.

Critical reception
Lullaby was described by Aida Edemariam (writing in The Guardian) as "stylishly written [...] brilliantly executed". It was compared to Gone Girl by both Celia Walden of The Telegraph and Lucy Scholes of The Independent, with the latter describing it as "a psychological thriller that will have readers on the edge of their seats".

The novel won the 2016 Prix Goncourt, a top French literary award.

Film adaptation 
In 2019, a film adaptation, of the same name in certain countries and entitled Perfect Nanny in some others, was made by director Lucie Borleteau, starring Karin Viard, Leïla Bekhti and Antoine Reinartz.

Television adaptation 
In January 2023, it was reported that a planned television limited series adaptation entitled The Perfect Nanny was in development at HBO with Legendary Television co-produce. Nicole Kidman and Maya Erskine set to star.

References

2016 French novels
Éditions Gallimard books
Prix Goncourt winning works
Novels set in Paris
French crime novels
Novels about child abuse
Novels about child care occupations
French novels adapted into films